Test cricket is a form of first-class cricket played at international level between teams representing full member countries of the International Cricket Council (ICC). A match consists of four innings (two per team) and is scheduled to last for up to five days. In the past, some Test matches had no time limit and were called Timeless Tests. The term "test match" was originally coined in 1861–62 but in a different context. 

Test cricket did not become an officially recognised format until the 1890s, but many international matches since 1877 have been retrospectively awarded Test status. The first such match took place at the Melbourne Cricket Ground (MCG) in March 1877 between teams which were then known as a Combined Australian XI and James Lillywhite's XI, the latter a team of visiting English professionals. Matches between Australia and England were first called "test matches" in 1892. The first definitive list of retrospective Tests was written by South Australian journalist Clarence P. Moody two years later and, by the end of the century, had gained acceptance.

There are now twelve full ICC member countries playing Test cricket. Day/night Tests were permitted by the ICC in 2012 and the first day/night match was between Australia and New Zealand at the Adelaide Oval in November 2015.

Early history

Growth of international cricket
Teams designated as "England" or "All England" began to play in the 18th century, but these teams were not truly representative. Early international cricket was disrupted by the French Revolution and the American Civil War. The earliest international cricket match was between the United States and Canada, on 24 and 26 September 1844 (bad weather prevented play on the 25th). Overseas tours by national English teams began in 1859 with visits to North America, Australia and New Zealand. The 1868 Australian Aboriginals were the first organised overseas team to tour England.

Two rival English tours of Australia were proposed in the early months of 1877, with James Lillywhite campaigning for a professional tour and Fred Grace for an amateur one. Grace's tour fell through and it was Lillywhite's team that toured New Zealand and Australia in 1876–77. Two matches against a combined Australian XI were later classified as the first official Test matches. The first match was won by Australia, by 45 runs and the second by England. After reciprocal tours established a pattern of international cricket, The Ashes was established as a competition during the Australian tour of England in 1882. A surprise victory for Australia inspired a mock obituary of English cricket to be published in the Sporting Times the following day: the phrase "The body shall be cremated and the ashes taken to Australia" prompted the subsequent creation of the Ashes urn.

The series of 1884–85 was the first to be held over five matches: England player Alfred Shaw, writing in 1901, considered the side to be "the best ever to have left England". South Africa became the third team to play Test cricket in 1888–89, when they hosted a tour by an under-strength England side. Australia, England and South Africa were the only countries playing Test cricket before World War I.

Terminology
The term "test match" was coined during the English tour of Australia in 1861–62 but in a different context. It meant that the English team was testing itself against each of the Australian colonies. Following Lillywhite's tour, Australian teams reciprocated, beginning with Dave Gregory's team in 1878. By the beginning of 1892, eight English teams had visited Australia and seven Australian teams had visited England. In its issue of 25 February 1892, Cricket: A Weekly Record of the Game revived the term "test match" and freely applied it to the three international matches which had just been played in Australia by Lord Sheffield's XI, starting with the match at the MCG which was billed as Lord Sheffield's Team v Combined Australia. The report began: "There was no little appropriateness in fixing the first of the three great test matches for January 1".

Clarence P. Moody
The first list of matches considered to be "Tests" was conceived and published by South Australian journalist Clarence P. Moody in his 1894 book, Australian Cricket and Cricketers, 1856 to 1893–94. Moody's proposal was well-received by Charles W. Alcock, editor of Cricket in England and his list of 39 matches was reproduced in the 28 December 1894 issue as part of an article entitled "The First Test Match". The list begins with the MCG match played 15–17 March 1877 and ends with the recent match at the Association Ground, Sydney played 14–20 December 1894. All 39 were retrospectively recognised as Test matches, as was the unlisted 1890 Old Trafford match that was abandoned without a ball being bowled. No South African matches were included in Moody's list but three against England were also given retrospective Test status. Moody became a newspaper editor and founded the Adelaide Sunday Mail in 1912.

Test status
Test matches are the highest level of cricket, played between national representative teams with "Test status", as determined by the International Cricket Council. , twelve national teams have Test status, the most recently promoted being Afghanistan and Ireland on 22 June 2017.

Teams with Test status
Test status is conferred upon a country or group of countries by the ICC. There are currently twelve men's teams that have been granted this status: international teams that do not have Test status can play first-class cricket in the ICC Intercontinental Cup, under conditions which are similar to Tests.

The teams with Test status (with the date of each team's Test debut) are:
 (15 March 1877)
 (15 March 1877)
 (12 March 1889)
 (23 June 1928)
 (10 January 1930)
 (25 June 1932)
 (16 October 1952)
 (17 February 1982) 
 (18 October 1992)
 (10 November 2000)
 (11 May 2018)
 (14 June 2018)

Nine of these teams represent independent sovereign nations:  the England cricket team represents the constituent countries of England and Wales, the West Indies is a combined team from fifteen Caribbean nations and territories, and Ireland represents both the Republic of Ireland and Northern Ireland.

Following the D'Oliveira affair in 1969, South Africa was suspended from all forms of cricket from 1970 until the end of the apartheid regime in 1991.

Zimbabwe's Test status was voluntarily suspended in 2006 because of very poor performances, but its Test status was reinstated in August 2011.

The ICC has made several proposals to reform the system of granting Test status, including having two tiers  with promotion and relegation, and/or a play-off between the winners of the ICC Intercontinental Cup and the team with the lowest Test ranking. These proposals have not been successful as of 2021.

Statistics

For statistical purposes, Tests are considered to be a subset of first-class cricket. Performances in first-class matches count towards only the first-class statistical record, but performances in Test matches count towards both the Test statistics and the first-class statistics.

Statisticians have developed criteria to determine which matches count as Tests if they were played before the formal definition of Test status. There have been exceptional circumstances including the simultaneous England touring sides of 1891–92 (in Australia and South Africa) and 1929–30 (in the West Indies and New Zealand), all of whose international matches are deemed to have Test status.

In 1970, a series of five "Test matches" was played in England between England and a Rest of the World XI: these matches, originally scheduled between England and South Africa, were amended after South Africa was suspended from international cricket due to their government's apartheid policies. Although initially given Test status and included as Test matches in some record books, including Wisden Cricketers' Almanack, this was later withdrawn, and a principle was established that official Test matches can only be between nations (note that the geographically and demographically small countries of the West Indies have, since 1928, fielded a coalition side). 

Despite this principle, in 2005, the ICC ruled that the six-day Super Series match that took place that October between Australia and a World XI was an official Test match: some cricket writers and statisticians, including Bill Frindall, have ignored the ICC's ruling and exclude this match from their records. 

The series of "Test matches" played in Australia between Australia and a World XI in 1971–72, and the commercial "Supertests" organised by Kerry Packer as part of his World Series Cricket enterprise played between "WSC Australia", "WSC World XI" and "WSC West Indies" from 1977 to 1979, have never been regarded as official Test matches as of 2021.

Conduct of the game

Playing time

A standard day of Test cricket consists of three sessions of two hours each, the break between sessions being 40 minutes for lunch and 20 minutes for tea. However, the times of sessions and intervals may be altered in certain circumstances: if bad weather or a change of innings occurs close to a scheduled break, the break may be taken immediately; if there has been a loss of playing time, for example because of bad weather, the session times may be adjusted to make up the lost time; if the batting side is nine wickets down at the scheduled tea break, then the interval may be delayed until either 30 minutes has elapsed or the team is all out; the final session may be extended by up to 30 minutes if 90 or more overs have not been bowled in that day's play (subject to any reduction for adverse weather); the final session may be extended by 30 minutes (except on the 5th day) if the umpires believe the result can be decided within that time.

Today, Test matches are scheduled to be played across five consecutive days. However, in the early days of Test cricket, matches were played for three or four days. Four-day Test matches were last played in 1973, between New Zealand and Pakistan. Until the 1980s, it was usual to include a 'rest day,' often a Sunday. There have also been 'Timeless Tests', which have no predetermined maximum time. In 2005, Australia played a match scheduled for six days against a World XI, which the ICC sanctioned as an official Test match, though the match reached a conclusion on the fourth day. In October 2017, the ICC approved a request for a four-day Test match, between South Africa and Zimbabwe, which started on 26 December 2017 and ended on the second day, 27 December. The ICC trialed the four-day Test format until the 2019 Cricket World Cup. In December 2019, Cricket Australia were considering playing four-day Tests, subject to consensus with other Test nations. Later the same month, the ICC considered the possibility of making four-day Test matches mandatory for the ICC World Test Championship from 2023.

There have been attempts by the ICC, the sport's governing body, to introduce day-night Test matches. In 2012, the International Cricket Council passed playing conditions that allowed for the staging of day-night Test matches. The first day-night Test took place during New Zealand's tour to Australia in November 2015.

Play

Test cricket is played in innings (the word denotes both the singular and the plural). In each innings, one team bats and the other bowls (or fields). Ordinarily four innings are played in a Test match, and each team bats twice and bowls twice. Before the start of play on the first day, the two team captains and the match referee toss a coin; the captain who wins the toss decides whether his team will bat or bowl first.

In the following scenarios, the team that bats first is referred to as Team A and their opponents as Team B.

Usually the teams will alternate at the completion of each innings. Thus, Team A will bat (and Team B will bowl) until its innings ends, and then Team B will bat and Team A will bowl. When Team B's innings ends, Team A begin their second innings, and this is followed by Team B's second innings. The winning team is the one that scores more runs in their two innings.

A team's innings ends in one of the following ways:
 The team is "all out". This typically occurs when a team has lost ten wickets (ten of the eleven batsmen having been dismissed) and are "bowled out". It may occasionally occur with the loss of fewer wickets if one or more batsmen are unavailable to bat (through injury, for example).
 The team's captain declares the innings closed, usually because they believe they have enough runs. A declaration before the innings starts is called an innings forfeiture.
 The team batting fourth score the required number of runs to win.
 The prescribed time for the match expires.

If, at the completion of Team B's first innings, Team A leads by at least 200 runs, the captain of Team A may (but is not required to) order Team B to have their second innings next. This is called enforcing the follow-on. In this case, the usual order of the third and fourth innings is reversed: Team A will bat in the fourth innings. It is rare for a team forced to follow-on to win the match. In Test cricket it has only happened four times, although over 285 follow-ons have been enforced. Australia was the losing team on three occasions, having lost twice to England, in 1894 and in 1981, and once to India in 2001. Most recently, on February 24, 2023, England lost to New Zealand by one run after enforcing the follow-on.

If the whole of the first day's play of a Test match has been lost because of bad weather or other reasons like bad light, then Team A may enforce the follow-on if Team B's first innings total is 150 or more fewer than Team A's. During the 2nd Test between England and New Zealand at Headingley in 2013, England batted first after the first day was lost because of rain. New Zealand, batting second, scored 180 runs fewer than England, meaning England could have enforced the follow-on, though chose not to. This is similar to four-day first-class cricket, where the follow-on can be enforced if the difference is 150 runs or more. If the Test is 2 days or fewer then the "follow-on" value is 100 runs.

After 80 overs, the captain of the bowling side may take a new ball, although this is not required. The captain will usually take the new ball: being harder and smoother than an old ball, a new ball generally favours faster bowlers who can make it bounce more variably. The roughened, softer surface of an old ball can be more conducive to spin bowlers, or those using reverse swing. The captain may delay the decision to take the new ball if he wishes to continue with his spinners (because the pitch favours spin). After a new ball has been taken, should an innings last a further 80 overs, then the captain will have the option to take another new ball.

A Test match will produce a result by means of one of six scenarios:
All four innings are complete. The team batting fourth are all out before overtaking the other team, usually before matching the other team's score. The team that batted third are the winners by a margin equal to the difference in the aggregate runs scored by the two teams (for example, "Team A won by 95 runs"). Very rarely (in over 2,000 Test matches played, it has only happened twice) the scores can end level, resulting in a tie.
The team batting in the fourth innings overtakes the opposing team's run total. The match ends, and the team batting fourth is the winner by a margin equal to the number of wickets still to fall in the innings (for example, "Team B won by five wickets").
The third innings concludes with the team that batted twice still trailing the team that batted once. The match ends without playing a fourth innings. The team that batted only once is the winner by a margin equal to "an innings" plus the difference in aggregate run totals of the teams (for example, "Team A won by an innings and 26 runs").
Time for the match expires without a result being reached. This usually occurs at the end of the last day of the match. The result is a draw: there is no winner, no matter how superior the position of one of the sides. Rain causing a loss of playing time is a common factor in drawn matches, although matches may be drawn even without interference from the weather: usually as a result of poor time management or an intentional effort on the part of one team to avoid losing.
The match is abandoned because the ground is declared unfit for play.  This has occurred three times, resulting each time in a draw being declared: England v Australia at Headingley, Leeds, 1975 (vandalism); West Indies v England at Sabina Park, Kingston, Jamaica, 1998 (dangerous ground); West Indies v England at Sir Vivian Richards Stadium, Antigua, 2009 (dangerous ground).
The match is awarded through a forfeiture. If a team refuses to take the field of play, the umpires may award the match to the opposing team. This has only happened once in Test cricket, in the 2006 fourth Test between England and Pakistan.

Competitions

Tours

Test cricket is almost always played as a series of matches between two countries, with all matches in the series taking place in the same country (the host). Often there is a perpetual trophy that is awarded to the winner, the most famous of which is the Ashes contested between England and Australia. There have been two exceptions to the bilateral nature of Test cricket: the 1912 Triangular Tournament, a three-way competition between England, Australia and South Africa (hosted by England), and the Asian Test Championship, an event held in 1998–99 and 2001–02.

The number of matches in Test series has varied from one to seven. Up until the early 1990s, Test series between international teams were organised between the two national cricket organisations with umpires provided by the home team. With the entry of more countries into Test cricket, and a wish by the ICC to maintain public interest in Tests in the face of the popularity of One Day International cricket, a rotation system was introduced that sees all ten Test teams playing each other over a six-year cycle, and an official ranking system (with a trophy held by the highest-ranked team). In this system, umpires are provided by the ICC. An elite panel of eleven umpires was maintained since 2002, and the panel is supplemented by an additional International Panel that includes three umpires named by each Test-playing country. The elite umpires officiate almost all Test matches, though usually not Tests involving their home country.

Perpetual trophies
Several pairs of Test teams have established perpetual trophies which are competed for whenever teams play each other in Test series. The current ones are:

Number of Perpetual Trophies contested by team

International Test rankings

The ten Test-playing nations are currently ranked as follows:

World Test Championship

After years of delays since proposals began in 2009, a league competition for Test cricket was held in 2019–2021. Arranged as a bilateral series in various countries with one team as host and another team as visitor. The length of each series varies between 2 and 5 matches. Ireland, Zimbabwe and Afghanistan are not taking part in this competition, but instead play a program of Test matches with each other and other teams during the same period.

Final results

Popularity
Supporters of Test cricket, including Adam Gilchrist, argue that it is "the ultimate test of a player's and team's ability". However, it has been suggested that Test cricket may be losing popularity, particularly in the face of competition from short form cricket. Day/night Test matches  have been suggested as one way to address this problem. The suggested fall in popularity has been disputed, with a Marylebone Cricket Club poll showing that 86% of all cricket fans support Test cricket, more than any other format.

See also

 List of Test cricket grounds
 List of Test cricket records
 Lists of Test cricketers
 List of cricketers who have played 100 Tests
 One Day International
 Twenty20 International

References

Bibliography
Ground Rules – A Celebration of Test Cricket, Barney Spender & David Gower, Dakini Books Ltd (Nov 2003), 
The Wisden Book of Test Cricket, Sir Donald Bradman (Foreword), Bill Frindall (Editor), Headline Book Publishing (1995), 
Marylebone Cricket Club (2003), The Laws of Cricket. Retrieved 2009-03-30.
International Cricket Council (2008), Standard Test Match Playing Conditions. Retrieved 2009-09-11.

External links
Origin of the name "Test"
USA v Canada – The oldest international sporting fixture
Preet Salh Punjabi Singer Biography "Wiki"

 
Cricket terminology
Sports originating in Australia
Cricket